Todd Dillon (born January 6, 1962) is an American former professional gridiron football player, a quarterback in the Canadian Football League  (CFL), where he played from 1986 to 1994 for the Ottawa Rough Riders and the Hamilton Tiger-Cats. Previously, he played two seasons in the United States Football League (USFL).  Dillon played college football at Long Beach State University. He is now a teacher at Tokay High School in Lodi, California. He's also an assistant coach on the school's varsity football team. Prior, he taught at Lodi High School, which like Tokay, is part of the Lodi Unified School District. Dillon was also the Lodi football head coach.

See also
 List of NCAA major college football yearly passing leaders
 List of NCAA major college football yearly total offense leaders

References

External links
 CFL stats

1962 births
Living people
American football quarterbacks
American players of Canadian football
Canadian football quarterbacks
Hamilton Tiger-Cats players
Houston Gamblers players
Long Beach State 49ers football players
Los Angeles Express players
New Jersey Generals players
Ottawa Rough Riders players
Sportspeople from Modesto, California
Players of American football from California